Peacock Peak is a peak 1 nautical mile (1.9 km) south of Bennett Bluff on the west side of upper Berry Glacier, in Marie Byrd Land. Mapped by United States Geological Survey (USGS) from surveys and U.S. Navy air photos, 1959–65. Named by Advisory Committee on Antarctic Names (US-ACAN) for Dennis S. Peacock, ionospheric physicist at Byrd Station, 1970–71.

References
 

Mountains of Marie Byrd Land